Nobel Vega (born August 21, 1930) better known as Tio Nobel (Uncle Nobel) is a Cuban actor and children's television personality. Vega is mostly remembered for his character as a boat captain who appeared on Puerto Rico's WKAQ-TV's "El Show del Tio Nobel" ("Uncle Nobel's Show"), a daily children's game show he hosted in which children played for prices, usually Mattel branded toys. His show competed with Spaniard Pacheco's "Cine Recreo", shown on WAPA-TV, Telemundo Puerto Rico's rival television station.

Biography
Vega became an actor in his native Cuba and he participated in various films before, after the Cuban revolution, he, like many other Cuban nationals of the era, left his country. He settled in Puerto Rico where he found television work and fame, first playing Bozo the Clown for young Puerto Rican audiences on WAPA-TV. Vega also participated in a telenovela, 1969's Conciencia Culpable.

Vega then moved to Telemundo Puerto Rico, where he starred as "Tio Nobel" for more than 20 years on the "Tio Nobel Show" as well as in 
"El Mundo Infantil del Tio Nobel" ("Uncle Nobel's Children's World") and "El Festival del Tio Nobel" ("Uncle Nobel's Festival"). In later years, he took his "Tio Nobel" character and moved to another Puerto Rican channel, Tele Once.

Filmography
Vega has participated in three films, including one Hollywood film.

"La Justicia de Los Villalobos" (1961, as "Machito")
"Aqui Estan Los Villalobos" (1962, also known as "La Justicia de Los Villalobos 2" and as "El Terror Blanco", as "Machito")
"Calendar Pin-up Girls" (1966)

Later life
Vega moved from Puerto Rico during the later stages of his life and he currently resides in Miami, Florida.

Health issues
Vega in his older age has suffered a number of health issues, including having a brain stroke which left him with difficulty to speak, heart problems which lead to having a pacemaker installed, several injuries and Alzheimer's disease.

Personal
Vega is married to his longtime wife, Nadine Zayas.

See also
List of Cubans

Fellow Cuban expatriates in Puerto Rico 
Luis Aguad Jorge
Carlos Muñiz Varela
Titi Chagua
Marilyn Pupo

References

Living people
1930 births
Cuban male actors
Cuban children's television presenters
Puerto Rican television personalities
People from Miami
Cuban emigrants to Puerto Rico